Port Royal is an unincorporated community in north-eastern Henry County, Kentucky, United States.

Location

The community's center is the intersection of State Highway 193 and Cane Run Road. "Port Royal is ten miles north-east from New Castle and one mile from the Kentucky River."

The elevation is 823 feet (251 m).

The ZIP code is 40058.

Demographics

At the census of 2010 the population of ZIP Code Tabulation Area 40058, which is centered on Port Royal, was 64.

At the census of 2000 it was 79.

Notable resident

Port Royal has a notable resident, the writer Wendell Berry. His fictional community of Port William is based on Port Royal.

References



Unincorporated communities in Kentucky
Unincorporated communities in Henry County, Kentucky
Louisville metropolitan area